The Cascade Conference is a Michigan high school athletic conference that was formed prior to the 1954 school year. The conference includes Class C schools with the majority of its members being from Jackson County along with one member each from Lenawee and Washtenaw counties.

History

Formation
The Cascades Conference was formed in 1954 with ten schools from the Jackson County League. The original members were: Brooklyn, Concord, East Jackson, Grass Lake, Hanvoer-Horton, Jackson Vandercook Lake, Michigan Center, Napoleon, Parma and Springport high schools.

Red and Blue
With the growth of suburbs, some Cascades Conference schools grew more rapidly than others. This led to the creation of the Red and Blue divisions. Between 1983 and 1996, four schools were listed as Cascades-Red Members: Jackson Lumen Christi, Jackson Northwest, Parma Jackson County Western and Brooklyn Columbia Central. In 1996, Jackson Northwest and Jackson Lumen Christi left the Cascades Red for the Capital-Circuit Conference. Brooklyn Columbia Central left the Cascades Red after 1995 and competed as an independent for two years, before joining the Lenawee County Conference at the start of the 1997 school year. Parma Jackson County Western left the Cascades Red after the 1995 school year and joined the Twin Valley Conference.

Expansion
In 2022, the Cascades Conference was looking to expand from eight to twelve schools for the 2022–23 school year. On June 13, Brooklyn Columbia Central of the Lenawee County Athletic Association accepted their invite to join the Cascades, which they were previously a member of from 1968 to 1996. A little over a week later, Leslie, a member of the Greater Lansing Athletic Conference accepted their invitation as well. Within a few weeks after Columbia Central and Leslie joined, two Big "8" members, Jonesville and Homer accepted their invitations to join the conference as well. All four schools will be joining the conference for the 2022–23 school year.

With the Cascades Conference expanding to twelve teams, the conference decided to split the league into two geographical divisions (East and West).

Member schools

Current members
The following institutions are full members of the Cascade Conference for the 2022–23 school year:

Notes

Future members 

Notes

Former members

Notes

Membership timeline

Notes

References

1954 establishments in Michigan
Jackson County, Michigan
Michigan high school sports conferences
Sports leagues established in 1954
Articles which contain graphical timelines